Amesbury Public Schools has, for more than 100 years, served students from the town of Amesbury, Massachusetts. , the district offered pK-12 education.

District Snapshot
Amesbury Public Schools
5 Highland Street
Amesbury, MA 01913
Website: [schools.amesburyma.gov]

History
The Amesbury Public Schools, which comprise the Amesbury High School, Amesbury Middle School, Amesbury Elementary School and Charles C. Cashman Elementary School as well as the Amesbury Innovation High School has served Amesbury, and, over the course of its history, many other communities educational needs. Amesbury students also have the option of receiving a vocational education at the Whittier Regional Vocational Technical High School in Haverhill, Massachusetts. With the recent renovation projects at the middle school and the Cashman School, as well as the current high school renovation project and anticipated work at the elementary school in the near future, Amesbury has some of the newest school buildings in the area.

Trivia
 Amesbury's longest serving superintendent, Fred C. English, served a total of 25 years and one month, from 1934 to 1960.
 Since the creation of the position in 1902, Amesbury has had 19 superintendents of schools.
 There have been two superintendents who have served longer than 10 years, Fred English, and Stephen J. Gerber, Ed.D., who served 1985 to 2004.
 David R. Gaul, superintendent for just 11 months, served the shortest term. 
 In the early 1960s, the idea of a regional school district with Salisbury, Massachusetts gained, and then lost, support.
 District offices, formerly housed in the Ordway Building on School Street, are currently housed in the former Horace Mann Primary School, built in 1908.
 Prior to the 1960s, Amesbury's high school was attended by the nearby towns of Seabrook, New Hampshire and South Hampton, New Hampshire among others. Only South Hampton continues this tradition.
 All schools currently in use were built between 1965 and 1975 (though the Middle School underwent a substantial expansion in the mid-1990s).

 
School districts in Massachusetts